St. Mary's Medical Center is a regional hospital in Grand Junction, Colorado, in Mesa County. The hospital has 310 beds, making it the largest hospital between Denver and Salt Lake City. The hospital has a Level II trauma center.

History

Origin
The Sisters of Charity of Leavenworth was formed out of the Sisters of Charity of Nazareth in Bardstown, Kentucky. Its foundation is accredited to Mother Xavier Ross, who traveled to Leavenworth at the invitation of Bishop Jean Baptiste Miege in 1858. The Sisters follow their traditions to Louise de Marillac, Saint Vincent de Paul, and the Daughters of Charity.

Shortly after her arrival, an orphanage for African-American children, an academy for girls, and a program for the visitation of prisoners at the nearby Fort Leavenworth was set up. The sisters became known for the foundation of hospitals across the area, most notably that of Saint Joseph Hospital in Denver, CO, which was founded by the sisters in 1873. The Sisters of Charity of Leavenworth set up 18 hospitals between Kansas and California between 1864 and 1952.

In 1895, Sisters Balbina Farrell and Louisa Madden of the Sisters of Charity of Leavenworth left Leavenworth, Kansas to establish a hospital in Grand Junction, Colorado. The hospital was officially opened on May 22, 1896. The original hospital was a wooden-framed structure capable of housing 10 beds. The construction of the hospital was funded through fundraisers, donations, and begging from the sisters.

Expansion

In 1912, the first brick structure was built to the original wooden-framed building. This new brick structure was capable of housing an additional 20 beds, putting the total up to 30 beds. Other minor additions were built between the 1920s and 1940s.

In 1985, a 125,000-square-foot facility was built on the hospital campus. The new facility housed a telemetry and intermediate care unit, a radiation oncology unit, a critical care unit, a perinatal center, and a pediatric unit capable of housing 20 beds.

In 1986, the hospital added a heart program that removed the need for patients in need of heart surgery to be transported to either Denver, CO or Salt Lake City, UT.

In 1994, a five-story tower was completed at the cost of $8 million. The tower added to the size of the hospital considerably, bringing it to seven-stories tall, and solidified its position as the largest medical center between Salt Lake City and Denver. The tower was renovated and fully reopened in 2010.

In April 2022, SCL Health, the healthcare organization that St. Mary's belonged to, merged with Intermountain Healthcare. The new organization took the name Intermountain Healthcare, but in early 2023, it changed its name to Intermountain Health.

Facilities

Services and units

According to St. Mary's Medical Center, the hospital provides the following:
Birthing Center
24 room Level IIIB neonatal intensive care unit (NICU)
12 labor rooms
Cardiac and vascular services
Emergency and trauma services
Level II Trauma Center
Helicopter transports via CareFLIGHT of the Rockies
Imaging center
Orthopedic and spine services
Regional blood center
Regional cancer center
Surgical specialties

Emergency care

The hospital's emergency department has the only level II trauma center in the region. The emergency department has over 30 examination rooms and 3 trauma rooms.

The hospital has a helipad on its tower, and works in conjunction with CareFLIGHT of the Rockies to provide air transportation for critical patients in the region

References

External links

Intermountain Health website

Hospitals in Colorado
Buildings and structures in Mesa County, Colorado
Hospitals established in 1896
1896 establishments in Colorado
Catholic hospitals in North America
Intermountain Health